Paxillogaster is a genus of fungi in the family Boletaceae. This is a monotypic genus, containing the single species Paxillogaster luteus.

References

Boletaceae
Monotypic Boletales genera
Taxa named by Egon Horak